Salyan, is a city and the capital of the Salyan District of Azerbaijan. The city of Salyan is industrialized and known for processing caviar.

History 
The city has been a continuous settlement of sal tribe, after whom the city named and occupied by Kura river. Salyan was part of Quba Khanate during 1680 to 1782 and ruled by various khans. Salyan was the administrative center of the Javad Uyezd of the Baku Governorate.

Throughout its history, Salyan has suffered from floods because of its proximity to the river and the relatively low elevation of most of the town.

Geography

Demographics

Administrative divisions
The municipality of Salyan consists of the city of Salyan. The mayor, presently Sevindik Hatamov, embodies the executive power of the city.

List of City's mayors

Salyan Khanate
(1729–1748) Hasanbay Khan
(1748–1757) Ibrahim Khan Rudbary
(1757–1768) Kalb Ali Khan
(1768–1782) Qubad Khan

Azerbaijani SSR
(1920) Yusif Gasimov
(1961–1966) Huseyn Huseynov

Azerbaijan Republic
(1993) A.Yusubov
(1993–2004) Valihat Azizov
(2004) Yusif Alakbarov
(2004–2009) Rasim Bashirov
(2009–2011) Aliagha Huseynov
(2011–2016) Tahir Karimov
(2016–present) Sevindik Hatamov

Economy

Culture

Sport
Salyan was home to former football teams Plastik Salyan and Mughan. Mughan through its history played in the Azerbaijan Premier League.

Transport

Public transport
Salyan has a large urban transport system, mostly managed by the Ministry of Transportation.

Education

Notable residents

Some of the city's many prestigious residents include: philosopher Ali bey Huseynzade, mathematician Vagif Guliyev, lieutenant general Rail Rzayev, poet Khalil Rza Uluturk and footballer Samadagha Shikhlarov.

References

External links

World Gazetteer: Azerbaijan – World-Gazetteer.com
The ministry of Culture and Tourism of Azerbaijan Republic: Azerbaijan

 
Populated places in Salyan District (Azerbaijan)